Mitch Peacock is a Canadian sportscaster, currently serving as the radio play-by-play announcer and Director of Media for the Manitoba Moose of the American Hockey League.

Prior to joining the Moose organization, he was a news anchor with CBC Winnipeg and a sideline reporter on Hockey Night In Canada.  Peacock also worked a variety of roles for CBC covering soccer events including the 2010 FIFA World Cup and Toronto FC matches.   He has also served as the anchor for the Fox Soccer Report on both Fox Soccer Channel and Fox Sports World Canada.

References

Living people
American Hockey League broadcasters
Association football commentators
Canadian radio sportscasters
Canadian television sportscasters
Canadian people of English descent
Manitoba Moose
National Hockey League broadcasters
Year of birth missing (living people)
Major League Soccer broadcasters